Kwon Eun-bi (born September 27, 1995), also known by the mononym Eunbi, is a South Korean singer and musical actress. She debuted as a member of the short-lived girl group Ye-A under the stage name Kazoo in 2014, before leaving the group and signing a contract with Woollim Entertainment. In 2018, she participated on the survival show Produce 48, finishing in seventh place, which allowed her to debut as a member and the leader of the show's girl group Iz*One.

Following Iz*One's disbandment, Woollim Entertainment revealed on August 5, 2021, that Eunbi was preparing to debut as a solo singer; her first mini album Open was released on August 24.

Life and career

Early life 
Kwon Eun-bi was born on September 27, 1995, in South Korea. Her family consists of her parents and an older brother. She attended Dong-il Middle School and graduated from School of Performing Arts Seoul. In middle school, she expressed to her parents her desire to attend a dance academy. Her parents were initially against her becoming a singer, and told her to attend a dance academy only as a hobby, wanting her to focus on her studies instead. Determined to become a singer, she finally persuaded her parents by sending a letter to her other family members, asking for help in convincing her parents to let her attend an arts high school. When she was 17, she was a backup dancer for girl groups such as Secret and Girl's Day, and was encouraged by member Hyeri (who was her senior in high school) to pursue her aspirations of becoming an idol. During this time, she was also working part-time at a Paris Baguette store.

Predebut 
Kwon debuted in the Kiroy Company-managed eight-member girl group Ye-A under the stage name 'Kazoo' on July 18, 2014, with the single "Up and Down". It is assumed that the group quietly disbanded after releasing only one single. She auditioned for several entertainment companies afterwards, and signed a contract with Woollim Entertainment.

Career

2018–2020: Produce 48 and debut with Iz*One

Kwon Eun-bi was one of four trainees from Woollim Entertainment who participated on the Mnet girl group survival show Produce 48, a collaboration between the Mnet series Produce 101 and the J-pop idol group AKB48. She consistently ranked among the Top 12, eventually finishing in 7th place, which allowed her to debut as a member of Iz*One, alongside fellow Woollim Entertainment trainee Kim Chae-won, and was named the group's leader. They debuted on October 29, 2018, with the single "La Vie en Rose".

In 2019, she became a permanent cast member of the JTBC show Respect Your Style, Real Life alongside Jung Hyung-don and Ahn Jung-hwan which first aired in May and ended in August of the same year. In February 2020, she made her debut as a songwriter and wrote and composed the song "Spaceship" which was released as a track for Iz*One's first studio album Bloom*Iz. The song charted at #130 on the Gaon Digital Chart. She wrote another song for their third mini-album Oneiric Diary entitled "With*One" as part of a songwriting team called Psycho Rabbit. It was released on June 15, 2020, and debuted at #152 on the Gaon Digital Chart.

On March 29, 2021, her Woollim Entertainment labelmate Sungkyu released the music video for his single "Hush", in which she played the female lead.

2021–present: Solo activities and solo debut
After wrapping up Iz*One's promotions on April 29, 2021, with a final concert in March, Kwon returned to Woollim Entertainment with labelmate Kim Chae-won as trainees. On June 29, she became the new host of FashionN's beauty program Follow Me along with Ha Sung-woon, Pentagon's Kino, and Freesia. On August 4, Kwon's labelmates Rocket Punch released their debut Japanese album Bubble Up! which includes a track written and co-produced by Kwon titled "Let's Dance".

On August 5, 2021, Woollim Entertainment announced that Kwon Eun-bi was preparing to debut as a solo artist and would release her debut album at the end of the month. Days later, it revealed her first extended play Open would be released on August 24.
On March 10, 2022, Kwon released the promotional single "Esper" through Universe Music for the mobile application, Universe. On March 24, 2022, Kwon Eunbi was announced as a cast member for the musical Midnight Sun as Seo Haena, with Ha Sung-woon, Shinee's Onew, Pentagon's Jinho, Song Geon-hee, Golden Child's Y, Apink's Kim Nam-joo, and Lee Sang-a. On April 4, 2022, Kwon released her second extended play Color along with the title track "Glitch". On May 9, 2022, Woollim Entertainment announced that Kwon would hold a solo concert 2022 KWON EUN BI 1st CONCERT Secret Doors on June 18 and 19, 2022.

On August 11, 2022, it was announced that Kwon's 'RUBI's ROOM' fan meeting would be held on October 30 and November 3 at Merpark in Osaka and Toyosu PIT in Tokyo; this was to be her first solo fan meeting to be held in Japan.

On September 20, 2022, her agency Woollim Entertainment released a comeback poster for her third extended play, Lethality, through its official SNS channel. The EP was released on October 12.

On November 7, 2022, Woollim Entertainment announced that Kwon will hold the "2022 KWON EUN BI 2nd CONCERT Next Door" concert in Seoul on December 17 and 18.

In March 2023, it was confirmed that Kwon will be hosting a fan meeting "Kwon Eun-bi <Million Stars Fan Meeting> in Macao", which will take place on April 8.

Discography

Extended plays

Singles

Promotional singles

Soundtrack appearances

Filmography

Television shows

Web shows

Radio shows

Theater

Songwriting credits 
All song credits are adapted from the Korea Music Copyright Association's database unless stated otherwise.

Awards and nominations

Notes

References

External links 

 
 

1995 births
Living people
People from Seoul
21st-century South Korean singers
21st-century South Korean women singers
Iz*One members
Produce 48 contestants
Woollim Entertainment artists
Japanese-language singers of South Korea
South Korean women pop singers
South Korean female idols
Singers from Seoul
School of Performing Arts Seoul alumni
Reality show winners